Aaron Scheffer (born August 15, 1975) is a former Major League Baseball pitcher for the Seattle Mariners. He also played in the Florida Marlins and Oakland Athletics organizations.

External links
Baseball Reference

1975 births
Living people
Baseball players from Michigan
Major League Baseball pitchers
Seattle Mariners players
Arizona League Mariners players
Bellingham Mariners players
Everett AquaSox players
Lancaster JetHawks players
Wisconsin Timber Rattlers players
Orlando Rays players
New Haven Ravens players
Tacoma Rainiers players
Brevard County Manatees players
Portland Sea Dogs players
Sacramento River Cats players